Yundum is a small town in Gambia, south of the capital, Banjul. It is situated adjacent to the country's international airport.

The only airport in Gambia is at Yundum, built in World War II. Post war it was used for passenger flights. Both British South American Airways and the British Overseas Airways Corporation had services, the former moving its service to Dakar, which had a concrete runway (as opposed to pierced steel planking). The airport was rebuilt in 1963 and the building is still in use today.

References

Populated places in the Gambia